Boys is a 2003 Indian Tamil-language coming-of-age musical film directed by S. Shankar. It stars newcomers Siddharth, Bharath, Manikandan, S. Thaman, Nakul and Genelia. The score and soundtrack are composed by A. R. Rahman (in his 75th film composition). The story revolves around the six youngsters, who experience the downfalls of adolescent life. The film was released on 29 August 2003 to positive reviews.

Plot 
Munna, Babu Kalyanam "Bob Galy", Juju, Krishna and Kumar are five friends. Although from different backgrounds, they all have common interests: disinterest in studies, obsession with smoking, drinking, ogling girls, having sex, watching pornography, and complaining about their parents. Their obsession with sex is such that while Munna's parents are out of town, they hire a prostitute Rani, but all of them back out at the last moment. One day, they meet Mangalam, a depressed middle-age man, in a bar, and help him home after he passes out. Although they first use him as a source to get alcohol, Mangalam enjoys their company and becomes a mentor of sorts for the boys.

One day, the boys see a teenage girl Harini, who is a BSc student having an ambition of becoming a doctor, and all of them decide to ask her out. Everyone's try fails, but they eventually become friends with her and her friends Sampatha, Padma, Ankita and Teju. However, Munna is still in love with Harini and cannot forget her. He conveys his feelings to her while on a day-out in a resort, but she rejects him. Later, Sampatha tells Munna that Harini would accept him if he streaks on Mount Road for fun. He believes her, and plans to do it. But his plan fails when his dress and shoes gets stuck at a lorry and when he goes after the lorry, he fails to get it. Soon a police officer comes there and chases him. He jumps in to Juju's bike and they both escape. But, Munna gets caught by the police and gets arrested. In the court, he lies that he did it as his friend told him that he will get 1,000, concealing the truth as Harini's career will be spoiled. The court orders him to pay a fine of 1,000 and imprisonment for one day. When Harini learns what Munna did, she bails him out and accepts his love.

Eventually, Munna's and Harini's parents learn about their relationship and are furious, as they want them to focus on their studies. Harini's father, an Indian Revenue Service (IRS) officer, holds a meeting involving Munna, Harini, Munna's friends, their parents, Mangalam, and Harini's friends at his house; both sets of parents decide that Munna and Harini will not contact each other till their studies are over. After that, if they are still in love, the parents will not oppose them. Although both Munna and Harini agree to this, they continue to long for each other, eventually running away from their homes and eloping at Tirumala. On hearing the news, Munna's and Harini's parents disown them. Munna's friends walk out of their homes too, in a show of solidarity for Munna and Harini.

Mangalam helps the teenagers find a modest residence and they take up part-time jobs to support themselves, including their education. This proves unsuccessful, so Mangalam encourages them to explore their natural musical talents. The teenagers form a band named "Boys", composing modern versions of Tamil devotional songs, and eventually gain recognition. Soon, they are approached by a Naxalite group to compose anti-government songs. They do it for money, leading to their arrest under POTA, and are also expelled from their respective colleges.

After their release, the gang show more resolve to succeed in their musical career. After a few unsuccessful attempts, they are finally signed by Sony Music and record their first album. While celebrating their success, a drunk Krishna accidentally tells Harini about their earlier encounter with Rani. Harini, hurt at this revelation, leaves Munna and returns to her parents, despite Munna pleading that he and Harini did not know each other before the encounter and that he did not have sex with Rani. As only Rani can prove that Munna did not have sex with her, the gang begin searching for her. Kumar spots Rani on a moving bus and tries to board it, but falls under the wheels of the bus and dies. Munna decides that his words were more than enough proof for Harini and accepts her decision.

The gang's debut album soon releases and becomes a huge hit. But without Harini, the lead female vocalist, the record labels are unwilling to sign them. When the gang request Harini's presence for a live show on MTV, her parents accept, but on the condition that Munna signs the divorce papers. Munna agrees, realizing that his and his friends' careers are more important than his love. The gang has a very successful live debut. They dedicate their first live success in memory of Kumar. They also dedicate their success to Mangalam, whom Krishna calls their godfather.

The day after the live show, Munna's and Harini's divorce hearing takes place. Mangalam, now the Boys' manager, fields many calls to replace Harini with another girl. When Harini looks at the pictures of all the girls vying to be the group's new lead female vocalist, a bout of jealousy strikes her. She angrily starts hitting Munna. As the two fight, they share a kiss and reconcile, cancelling their divorce.

Cast

 Siddharth as Munna
 Bharath as Babu Kalyanam ('Bob Galy')
 Genelia as Harini
 Vivek as Mangalam (Sundaram) 
 S. Thaman as Krishna
 Manikandan as Kumar
 Nakul as Juju
 Swetha as Sampatha
 Amanda as Padma
 Sindhuri as Ankita 
 Reshu as Teju
 Ravi Prakash as M. Chandra Shekar, Harini's father
 Anita Ratnam as Harini's mother
 A. V. Ramanan as Munna's father
 Janaki Sabesh as Renuka, Munna's mother
 Ilavarasu as Kumar's father
 Kalairani as Kumar's mother
 Subhashini as Bob Gally's mother
 Raviraj as Juju's father
 K. B. Mohan as Krishna's father
 Kamal Chopra
 Bhuvaneswari as Rani
 Chitti Babu as Hari
 Manobala as Ajay
 Ramji as Bhaskar
 Delhi Kumar as a judge
 Solomon Pappaiah as a judge
 A. C. Murali Mohan
 Suryakanth as 'Pimp' Manickam
 Rajan as Anti-Terrorism Officer	
 Senthil as Anna Veri Kannaiyan (guest appearance)
 Hariharan in a cameo appearance as himself
 Blaaze in a cameo appearance as a Music Award Show Host
 SPB as in a cameo appearance as a Music Award Show Host
 Vijay Yesudas as in a cameo appearance as a Music Award Show Host
 Ranjith as in a cameo appearance as a Music Award Show Host

Production

Development
In December 2002, it was announced that Shankar would make a film titled Boys featuring newcomers. He had postponed the making of Robot starring Kamal Haasan and Preity Zinta to start this film, with the announcement prompting thousands of applications from youngsters who wanted to feature in it. Shankar opted to introduce five debutants to play the lead characters and held auditions in 2002, with over 500 applicants being video tested.

Siddharth had initially worked as an assistant director to Mani Ratnam in Kannathil Muthamittal, and the script writer of that film, Sujatha, was insistent that Siddharth auditioned for Boys. After consulting with Mani Ratnam, he met Shankar, auditioned, and got the role of Munna. Shankar had seen Bharath at a dance programme, Inspirations at the Music Academy by 'Swingers', and called him to appear in screen tests that included delivering dialogues and dancing before selecting him to do the role of Bob Galy. Bharath was initially earmarked to play the lead role in the film before the team found Siddharth. Sai Srinivas, a percussionist and a drummer, who had worked with leading music directors was added after a successful audition in which he had to play the drums and went on to help out with the background score. Nakul, brother of actress Devayani, was a second-year college student who was also chosen. His family had sent some pictures of Nakul's elder brother Mayur to Shankar's office and, after seeing Nakul in one of the pictures, Shankar approached him. Manikandan, a visual communications graduate who had featured in Kala master's dance troupe doing stage shows, was also selected. Genelia D'Souza, who was shooting for Hindi film Tujhe Meri Kasam, was chosen among 300 girls after Shankar was impressed by her Parker Pen commercial alongside Amitabh Bachchan, her voice was dubbed by Rathi of Solla Marandha Kadhai. While finalising the lead cast, Shankar had also approached Bhagyaraj's son Shanthanu and Sarathkumar's daughter Varalaxmi, but their respective fathers turned down the opportunities.

Ravi K. Chandran was the principal director of photography; he introduced the linking of 62 cameras for the first time and the use of time-freeze technology in Boys. Cinematographers K. V. Anand and V. Manikandan were credited for filming two songs, while directors Gandhi Krishna and Balaji Sakthivel were a part of Shankar's assistant team.

Filming
Boys was launched at the Kalaivaanar Arangam in Chennai with Rajinikanth attending the event as the chief guest of the function and the new cast was introduced to the media. Filming began later that day, and two days later a teaser trailer of the film was broadcast on television.

The song "Ale Ale" was picturised at the Bridestowe Estate Lavender Farm in Scottsdale, Tasmania, Australia where cinematographer Ravi K. Chandran linked 62 cameras, using a new 'time-freeze' technique with the help of Australian cinematographer Mark Ruff's rig. Mark Kobe, who had been a part of the teams of Godzilla and Independence Day, carried out the computer graphic effects for Boys and created a 3D female to feature in the song "Girlfriend". Another song, "Dating", was shot at a set created by Sabu Cyril on the Chennai seashore where he created a seaside swimming pool, restaurant, water volleyball, and discothèque for the song sequence. For "Boom Boom", Cyril made a set out of waste materials like steel, tin sheets, bottles, used cans of Pepsi, Coca-Cola, Dalda (oil) and wood waste to create the backdrop, whilst the actors in the song were dressed by designer Arjun Fazil in matchsticks, film rolls, videotape, and crisps covers. "Maro Maro" was picturised on 500 young dancers at the Jawaharlal Nehru Stadium, Kochi, while for "Secret of Success", the team were given permission to use the MTV logo as the scene saw the band performing at the MTV Awards. The background score for both these songs were sung by Gulzar, Sherefa, Ranya and Sameera.

Release
The film was released on 29 August 2003. It was also dubbed and released in Telugu with the same title. Its Hindi soundtrack was released in 2012, 9 years after its original release. The Hindi dubbed version of the film was released on Zee5 on 2019 to early 2020, 17 years after the original release.

Reception
The film was mostly positive review critics. Siddhu Warrier of Rediff cited that the film "gets enmeshed in an intricate array of sub-plots. And somewhere along the way, the story begins to meander", adding that "college students, especially guys, might watch Boys more than once for the titillating scenes, the non-veg jokes, and, most importantly, the skimpy, transparent clothing sported by the heroine." Guru Subramaniam, also from Rediff stated that "Shankar's overconfidence in selling situations to the audience has failed this time. Many scenes, including the climax, look ordinary without any build-up sequences." Shankar later pointed out that "only youngsters" came to watch as he failed to appeal to "other age groups" as well. The core plot resembled the 1985 movie Fast Forward.

Box office
In Kerala, the film was bought by the distributor for 4 lakh, it collected more than 2.5 crore from the state.

Soundtrack

The soundtrack, featuring seven songs composed by A. R. Rahman, was launched on 28 June 2003. It was the seventh collaboration of Shankar and Rahman, a combination that is one of the most successful in India. About the making of "Girlfriend", Shankar said,

"I had told my crew and associates in the beginning itself that we had to think like an 18-year-old as the film is about youth and their desires. So when lyricist Pa.Vijay and Rahman sat together, we wanted a catchy number which the youth can relate to. At 18, every boy dreams of having a girlfriend. Rahman came up with a perfect fast paced peppy tune and Vijayan’s lyrics fell into place as it establishes the yearning for a girlfriend. It sets the mood for the film as it appears in the first reel of Boys."

Original track list

Telugu track list

Hindi track list
(Released on 15 August 2012 by Pen Music Ltd.)

Critical reception
The album was met with positive reviews upon release, but the sales were lagging initially. Star Music, the company which had bought the rights of the soundtrack, was able to sell only 60,000 records in the first week. However, in the following weeks, sales drastically increased and the soundtrack became the best-selling album of the year. Rediff stated, "A R Rahman has helmed the scoring of what is certainly the best of Tamil music this year. Take note of Vaali's lyrics for 'Secret of success' and P.A Vijay's 'Dating'."

References

External links
 

2003 films
Films set in Chennai
Indian rock music films
Indian teen comedy films
2000s Tamil-language films
Films scored by A. R. Rahman
Films directed by S. Shankar
Indian coming-of-age films
Films shot in Tasmania
Films shot in Kochi
Films about musical groups
2003 romantic comedy-drama films
2003 comedy films
2003 drama films